Viktor Viktorovich Stroyev (born 16 January 1987) is a Russian former footballer.

Career statistics

External links
  Player page on the official FC Tom Tomsk website
 

1987 births
Footballers from Voronezh
Living people
Russian footballers
Russia youth international footballers
Russia under-21 international footballers
Association football defenders
FC Tom Tomsk players
Russian Premier League players
FC Fakel Voronezh players
FC Zenit Saint Petersburg players